The following is a list of Sites of Special Scientific Interest in the South Wester Ross and Cromarty Area of Search.  For other areas, see List of SSSIs by Area of Search.

 Abhainn Alligin
 Allt nan Carnan
 An Teallach
 Ardlair - Letterewe
 Attadale
 Aultbea
 Baosbheinn
 Beinn Bhan
 Beinn Eighe
 Coille Dhubh
 Coulin Pinewood
 Doire Damh
 Fionn Loch Islands
 Inverasdale Peatlands
 Loch Maree
 Meall Imireach
 Monar Forest
 Rassal
 River Kerry
 Shieldaig Woods
 Slumbay Island
 Talladale Gorge
 Torridon Forest
 Wester Ross Lochs

 
South Wester Ross and Cromarty